Celestine Maddy is an American, author, environmentalist, and publisher. She is the founder of Wilder Quarterly magazine and co-author of A Wilder Life with Abbye Churchill.

Career 
After completing high school in 1996 at the age of 18, Maddy chose to not attend college and instead applied for writing positions at publications including Vice and High Times, while also having jobs at restaurants on the side for income. She later received an advertising position at StrawberryFrog. She later received a position as "Circulation Director" for the New York independent magazine Paper in 2004. By 2008, she had created her own ad blog named Agency Spy that was later purchased by Adweek. In 2011, Maddy founded  the magazine Wilder Quarterly and co-authored a book about the experience in 2016 with Abbye Churchill titled A Wilder Life. She was recognized on Fast Company’s Most Creative People list in 2012.

Executive positions 
Maddy has been an executive in advertising and technology for the last 20 years. She was the Head of Global Brand and Consumer Marketing at Pinterest. She served as co-CEO of The Wing. She also served as the VP of Marketing for Reddit and Foursquare. She is now the managing director of Communications and Marketing for Laurene Powell Jobs’s, Emerson Collective.

Awards and honors 
 2012 –  Named one of Fast Company's 100 Most Creative List in 2012
 2014 – Named one of the  Fast Companhy's Most Creative People in Business 1000: The Complete List
 2015 – won a Cannes Lion as a planner with UK agency Dare for Sony Ericsson

References 

Living people
American writers
American book publishers (people)
American women chief executives
American environmentalists
Year of birth missing (living people)